Simensen is a surname. Notable people with the surname include:

Bjørn Simensen (born 1947), Norwegian culture administrator and former journalist
Don Simensen (1926–1994), American football player
Jarle Simensen (born 1937), Norwegian historian
Kåre Simensen (born 1955), Norwegian politician for the Labour Party
Karen Simensen (married name Klæboe) (1907–1996), Norwegian figure skater
Sigurd Simensen (1888–1969), Norwegian newspaper editor and politician

See also
Simensen Peak, standing on the north side of Glitrefonna Glacier in the Sor Rondane Mountains of Antarctica
Simonsen

Norwegian-language surnames